Paw Paw Creek Bridge No. 52 was a historic Bow-String arch bridge located in Richland Township, Miami County, Indiana.  It was built in 1874 by the Wrought Iron Bridge Company and spanned Paw Paw Creek.  It was a single-span wrought iron structure with an overall length of 111 feet and width of 21 feet.. The bridge was disassembled after a tree fell on it.

It was listed on the National Register of Historic Places in 1983, and delisted in 2015.

References

Former National Register of Historic Places in Indiana
Bridges completed in 1874
Transportation buildings and structures in Miami County, Indiana
Road bridges in Indiana
Arch bridges in the United States
Wrought iron bridges in the United States